James Clyde Jones (born March 3, 1941) is a former professional American football wide receiver. He played for four seasons for the National Football League's Chicago Bears (1965–1967) and the American Football League's Denver Broncos (1968).

References

1941 births
Living people
People from Henderson, North Carolina
Players of American football from North Carolina
American football wide receivers
Wisconsin Badgers football players
Chicago Bears players
Denver Broncos (AFL) players